The 2013 Windward Islands Tournament was an international football tournament between the Windward Islands nations, with the exception of Dominica, which was hosted by St. Vincent between 21 April and 25 April 2013. Matches took place at Victoria Park in Kingstown. The tournament was organised by the Windward Islands Football Association (WIFA) and received financial assistance from CONCACAF.  It was the first time that the tournament has been held since 2001. After the three nations were eliminated from 2014 FIFA World Cup qualification and the 2013 CONCACAF Gold Cup, none of them were scheduled for any international matches. Therefore, the tournament was organized to assess current and future talent. After Dominica withdrew, they were replaced by a team compromised exclusively of players from the NLA Premier League organized by the Saint Vincent and the Grenadines Football Federation called the "President's XI."

Grenada won the tournament, beating Saint Vincent and the Grenadines in the final match of the tournament.  Grenada only needed a draw to be named champions.

Dominica withdrawal
Dominica was originally scheduled to take part in the tournament but withdrew on 19 April, only two days before the tournament began, after head coach Kurt Hector and defender Noran Jno Hope were killed in a car accident on the way to Melville Hall Airport to meet their other teammates to fly to St. Vincent. Tournament organizers decided to not cancel the tournament as a tribute.  WIFA then released a revised schedule

Squads

Fixtures
All times are local (UTC−4)

Goal scorers

References

Windward
Windward Islands Tournament